Francisco de Paula de Cea Bermúdez y Buzo (28 October 1779, in Málaga – 6 July 1850, in Paris) was a Spanish politician and diplomat who served twice as Prime Minister of Spain.

Biography
A successful businessman, he was sent in 1810 by the Cadiz Cortes to Russia, to forge an alliance against Napoleon. After the War, he was Ambassador in Constantinople (1820–1823) and London (1824). In that year he became Prime Minister for the first time, but was dominated by Francisco Calomarde, the real leader of the Cabinet. 
When the cabinet fell in October 1825, he became again Ambassador in Dresden (1825–1827) and London (1827–1832).

On 1 October 1832, he was recalled to become Prime Minister again, in the turbulent years when Ferdinand VII of Spain died, and the Pragmatic Sanction of 1830 came into effect, leading to the First Carlist War. He was also the architect of the 1833 territorial division of Spain.

He was deposed in January 1834 and emigrated to Paris, where he died in 1850.

Sources

Prime Ministers of Spain
Foreign ministers of Spain
1779 births
1850 deaths
Moderate Party (Spain) politicians
19th-century Spanish politicians
Ambassadors of Spain to the United Kingdom of Great Britain and Ireland